Yan Hong is the name of:

Yan Hong (racewalker) (born 1966), Chinese race walking athlete
Yan Hong (swimmer) (born 1967), Chinese swimmer

See also
Yanhong (盐鸿), a town in Shantou, Guangdong, China
Yang Hong (disambiguation)